The 2012 FA Trophy Final was the 43rd final of the Football Association's cup competition for levels 5–8 of the English football league system. The match was contested by Newport County and York City. York City were beaten finalists in 2009, but it was Newport County's first final and their debut visit to Wembley in their 100-year history.

Newport County defeated Forest Green Rovers, Worksop Town, Carshalton Athletic, Northwich Victoria and Wealdstone en route to the Final.

York City defeated Solihull Moors, Salisbury City, Ebbsfleet United, Grimsby Town, and Luton Town en route to the final.

One lifelong Newport County fan, 95-year-old Ron Jones, uncle of chairman Chris Blight, was reported to have been looking forward to the game after having watched the club home and away for most of his life.

York City won the match 2-0 thanks to goals from Matty Blair and Lanre Oyebanjo.

Route to the final

Newport County

York City

Match

Details

References

FA Trophy Finals
FA Trophy Final
Fa Trophy Final
Fa Trophy Final 2012
Fa Trophy Final 2012
Events at Wembley Stadium
Tro
Fa Trophy Final